Liberton may refer to:
Liberton, Edinburgh, Scotland, a suburb
Liberton High School
Liberton, New Zealand, a suburb of Dunedin